Sex trafficking in Taiwan is human trafficking for the purpose of sexual exploitation and slavery that occurs in the Republic of China. Taiwan is a country of origin, destination, and transit for sexually trafficked persons.
 
Taiwanese citizens, primarily women and girls, have been sex trafficked within Taiwan and to other countries in Asia and different continents. Foreign victims are sex trafficked into the country. Children, persons in poverty, and migrants are particularly vulnerable to sex trafficking. Victims are deceived, threatened, and or forced into prostitution and their passports and other documents are often taken. They suffer from physical and psychological abuse and trauma and are typically guarded and or locked up in poor conditions. A number contract sexually transmitted diseases from rapes. 

Male and female traffickers come from all social and economic classes of Taiwan. Traffickers are often members of or facilitated by crime syndicates and gangs. The extent of sex trafficking in Taiwan is difficult to know because of the lack of data, secretive nature of sex trafficking crimes, and other factors.

Non-governmental organizations
The Taipei Women's Rescue Foundation rescues victims of sex trafficking in Taiwan.

References

 

Child sexual abuse
Crime in Taiwan by type
Forced prostitution
Organized crime activity
Taiwanese women
Law enforcement in Taiwan
Society of Taiwan
Prostitution in Taiwan
Sex industry
Taiwan
Social issues in Taiwan
Crimes against women
Violence against women in Taiwan